
This article presents a timeline of events in the history of the United Kingdom from 1700 AD until 1799 AD. For a narrative explaining the overall developments, see the related history of the British Isles.

United Kingdom

England

Wales

See also 
 Timeline of British history
 History of the British Isles
 History of the United Kingdom
 History of England
 History of Ireland
 History of Northern Ireland
 History of Scotland
 History of Wales
 History of the United Kingdom

British history timelines